Patrick Mullen (born Patrick Mullin; May 6, 1844 – February 14, 1897) is one of only 19 servicemen to twice receive the Medal of Honor. He was a member of the United States Navy.

Biography
Patrick Mullen was born May 6, 1844, in Ireland and joined the United States Navy from Baltimore, Maryland. While stationed aboard the USS Wyandank he received the Medal of Honor for his actions during a boat expedition up Mattox Creek, March 17, 1865.

Medal of Honor citation

FIRST AWARD
Rank and Organization:
Boatswain's Mate, U.S. Navy. Entered service at: Baltimore, Md. Birth: Baltimore, Md. G.O. No.: 59, June 22, 1865.

Citation:

Served as boatswain's mate on board the U.S.S. Wyandank during a boat expedition up Mattox Creek, March 17, 1865. Rendering gallant assistance to his commanding officer, Mullen, lying on his back, loaded the howitzer and then fired so carefully as to kill and wound many rebels, causing their retreat.

SECOND AWARD
Rank and Organization:
G.O. No.: 62, June 29, 1865.

Citation:

Served as boatswain's mate on board the U.S.S. Don, 1 May 1865. Engaged in picking up the crew of picket launch No. 6, which had swamped. Mullen, seeing an officer who was at that time no longer able to keep up and was below the surface of the water, jumped overboard and brought the officer to the boat, thereby rescuing him from drowning, which brave action entitled him to wear a bar on the medal he had already received at Mattox Creek, 17 March 1865.

See also

List of Medal of Honor recipients
List of American Civil War Medal of Honor recipients: M–P

Notes

External links

1844 births
1897 deaths
Irish emigrants to the United States (before 1923)
United States Navy Medal of Honor recipients
United States Navy sailors
Military personnel from Baltimore
American Civil War recipients of the Medal of Honor
Irish-born Medal of Honor recipients
Double Recipients of the Medal of Honor